Larkinella ripae is a Gram-negative and short rod-shaped bacterium from the genus of Larkinella which has been isolated from seashore soil.

References

External links
Type strain of Larkinella ripae at BacDive -  the Bacterial Diversity Metadatabase

Cytophagia
Bacteria described in 2017